Mary Lou Piatek and Robin White were the defending champions, but none competed this year.

Candy Reynolds and Anne Smith won the title by defeating Sandy Collins and Kim Sands 7–6, 6–1 in the final.

Seeds

Draw

Draw

References

External links
 Official results archive (ITF)

Virginia Slims of Pennsylvania
1986 Virginia Slims World Championship Series